Khachmaz is a town in the Khachmaz District of Azerbaijan.

Etymology

Modern historians believe that the name Khachmaz derives from Khachmataki tribe of Huns, which transformed into Khacmaz in the middle of 7th century. In the second middle of the 7th century, part of the tribe migrated to the territory of the current Oghuz district and constructed the settlement and named Khachmar fortress.

Economy
The economy of Khachmaz is partially agricultural, partially tourist-based, with some industries in operation.

Tourism
Khachmaz is considered a popular tourist destination, especially due to the Nabran municipality. The combination of a warm summer climate, woods along the seashore and clean golden beaches was exploited by the construction of large numbers of hotels and apartments in Khacmaz.

Notable residents

International relations

Twin towns — Sister cities
Khacmaz is twinned with the following cities:

 Yalta, Ukraine, (since 2009)
 Derbent, Russia.
 Gardabani, Georgia.
 Iğdır, Turkey.

Gallery

References

External links

World Gazetteer: Azerbaijan – World-Gazetteer.com

Populated places in Khachmaz District
1938 establishments in Azerbaijan